Haathi Mere Saathi is a 1971 Indian Hindi-language drama film, directed by M. A. Thirumugam, with screenplay written by Salim–Javed and dialogues by Inder Raj Anand. The movie has a Disneyesque appeal with an Indian twist. Haathi Mere Saathi was the biggest hit of 1971 going by box office collections, and was also critically acclaimed. The film stars Rajesh Khanna and Tanuja. The film at that point in time was the biggest hit ever made by a South Indian producer in Hindi.

The story was written by producer Sandow M. M. A. Chinnappa Thevar who is of Tamil origin and owned Devar Films in Tamil Nadu. Thevar also played a small cameo in the film. Directed and edited by Thevar's brother M.A.Thirumugham, it had music by Laxmikant-Pyarelal and lyrics by Anand Bakshi. The film was also the first collaboration of Salim-Javed (Salim Khan and Javed Akhtar), who were officially credited as screenplay writers. The film was based on Sandow M. M. A. Chinnappa Thevar's 1967 Tamil movie Deiva Cheyal. After the success of this movie, Thevar remade it in Tamil again in 1972 as Nalla Neram. This film is counted among the 17 consecutive hit films of Rajesh Khanna between 1969 and 1971, by adding the two-hero films Marayada and Andaz to the 15 consecutive solo hits he gave from 1969 to 1971.

Plot 
Orphaned Raju (Rajesh Khanna), in the company of four elephants, has to perform with them at street corners, in order to survive. The back-story is that as an orphan, they have saved his life from a leopard. In time, he makes it big, and starts Pyar Ki Duniya (The World of Love), a zoo in which various wild animals reside along with his elephants, among whom Ramu is closest to him. Slowly he amasses a fortune, and is able to build his own private zoo, housing tigers, lions, bears, and of course the four elephants. He treats all the animals as his friends. He meets with Tanu (Tanuja), and both fall in love. Tanu's rich dad, Ratanlal (Madan Puri), is opposed to this alliance, but subsequently relents, and permits the young couple to get married. However, trouble looms soon after as Tanu feels neglected. Things worsen when their child is born, and Tanu, fearing physical harm to her child from the elephants, tells Raju to choose between the elephants and his family. When Raju chooses his lifelong friends over wife and son, Ramu decides to bring the estranged couple together, but to save the family and the child from the villainous Sarwan Kumar (K.N. Singh), he sacrifices his life.

Cast 

 Rajesh Khanna as Raj Kumar "Raju"
 Tanuja as Tanuja "Tanu"
 Madan Puri as Ratanlal
 Sujit Kumar as Gangu
 K. N. Singh as Sarvan Kumar
 Mehmood Junior as Chhote
 Naaz as Paro
 David as Johny
 Abhi Bhattacharya as Mr. Kumar
 Jayakumari
 Chinnappa Thevar in a cameo appearance

Soundtrack

Development 
Javed Akhtar on being questioned as to how the film came about, said "One day, he Rajesh Khanna went to Salimsaab and said that Mr. Devar had given him a huge signing amount with which he could complete the payment for his bungalow Aashirwad. But the film was a remake [of Deiva Cheyal] and the script of the original was far from being satisfactory. He told us that if we could set right the script, he would make sure we got both money and credit. "I can't do such a terrible script," he said. "And I can't leave it because I need the money!'".

Box office 
Haathi Mere Saathi was the highest-grossing Indian film of 1971.

The film was an overseas blockbuster in the Soviet Union, where it sold 34.8million tickets in 1974. The film's overseas Soviet gross was 8.7millionrubles (or ), equivalent to US$ million with inflation.

Awards 
Earlier titled Pyar Ki Duniya, the film also won a special award from the Society for Prevention of Cruelty to Animals (SPCA) for lyricist Anand Bakshi. Its music on HMV (as Saregama was known then) won a Silver Disc for its sales, making it the first-ever Indian gramophone record to do so.

Reception 
Times of India noted that 40 years down the line, Haathi Mere Saathi remains unmatched in its enduring magic, and Hindi cinema has yet to make another children's feature to match its stature and success.

Quotes on the film 
In an interview, Tanuja said, "I showed them the film when Kajol was six and Tanishaa around three years old, and for two weeks Kajol did not speak to me!! "Mummy, you killed the elephant! Because of you, he had to die!" screamed Kajol! "And Tanishaa was annoyed too!" Tanuja loved working with the elephants after some initial apprehensions. "They really began to like me, especially the she-elephant who played Ramu. There is a sequence where he had to push me through a door and fight a snake that was about to bite the baby, but the elephant had got so fond of me that he refused to do so! Finally, they had to shoot separate close-ups of the elephant and my back and of me falling down!"

On its 40th anniversary on 5 May 2011, Pyarelal recalled, "Laxmi (Laxmikant) and Devar got along fabulously well! Devar had an innate music sense and a feel for rhythm, and he loved our title-track. But the tussle came up over the sad song, "Nafrat Ki Duniya", which was the only song sung by (Mohammed) Rafisaab in the film. I recall voicing my doubts. But Laxmi, the director and Rajesh Khanna were staunchly in favour of keeping that song. And the audience cried with the song and Anand Bakshisaab's lyrics."

Notes

References

External links 
 

1971 films
1970s Hindi-language films
Films scored by Laxmikant–Pyarelal
Hindi films remade in other languages
Indian children's films
Films with screenplays by Salim–Javed
Elephants in India
Films directed by M. A. Thirumugam
Films about elephants